Polyaminopropyl biguanide (PAPB) is a disinfectant and a preservative used for disinfection on skin and in cleaning solutions for contact lenses. It is also an ingredient in many deodorant bodysprays. It is a polymer or oligomer where biguanide functional groups are connected by propyl hydrocarbon chains. PAPB is specifically bactericidal at very low concentrations (10 mg/L) and is also fungicidal.

Biocidal activity
It has a unique method of action: the polymer strands are incorporated into the bacterial cell membrane, which disrupts the membrane and reduces its permeability, which has a lethal effect to bacteria. It is also known to bind to bacterial DNA, alter its transcription, and cause lethal DNA damage.

Disinfectant
PAPB solutions are sold for use as a general disinfectant solution to be applied onto skin. As it is not cytotoxic, it can be applied directly into wounds. It is also not irritating like more traditional disinfectants such as alcohols (ethanol, isopropanol) and oxidizers (iodine).

Contact lens solution
A contact lens solution containing polyaminopropyl biguanide in combination with a borate buffer has been patented. The solution is disinfecting and preservative and has a broad spectrum of bactericidal and fungicidal activity at low concentrations coupled with very low toxicity when used with soft-type contact lenses.

See also
 Antimicrobial resistance
 Polyhexanide, a related biguanide disinfectant
 Benzalkonium chloride
 Stearalkonium chloride
 Ethylenediaminetetraacetic acid
 Triclosan
 Thiomersal

References

Polymers
Biguanides
Preservatives
Disinfectants